= Koszhar =

Village in Kazakhstan

Coordinates: 46.149818°N 61.758469°E

Koszhar (Kazakh: Қосжар, Qosjar) is a small village situated inside Kzyl-Orda, Kazakhstan, on the banks of Lake Qamystybas. The village's economy is based on camel farming and fishing. Koszhar is 55 meters (180 ft) above sea level and the population of the village is estimated to be somewhere between 100 and 200. Koszhar is located west of the M32 highway, considered one of the most dangerous and poorly maintained highways in the world.
